is a 4-season Japanese apocalyptic television / streaming drama co-produced by NTV and Hulu, of how a young man and other survivors fight to survive an invasion of zombies. Season 1 was broadcast on NTV from January 17 to March 21, 2021. Season 2 was shown on Hulu from March 21 to April 25, 2021. Season 3 was shown on Hulu from February 25 to April 1, 2022. Season 4 was shown on Hulu from March 19, 2023.

In December 2022, it was announced that a movie has been planned.

Plot

Season 1
Hibiki Mamiya is a car mechanic who has been dating his girlfriend, Kurumi Ogasawara, since high school. On the day when he was going to propose to her, he was trapped in a tunnel collapse. When he escaped 4 days later, the outside world had changed completely to be invaded by zombies known as 'golems'. Hibiki met and worked with both old and new friends as he fought his way to be reunited with his girlfriend.

Season 2
Hibiki and his team arrived at a shelter 'House of Hope' and discovered that the place hid more secrets than it appeared. The search for the vaccine against the golem virus revealed the secret of what happened to Hibiki's family 16 years ago.

Season 3
As Hibiki and Yuzuki embarked on their lone journey, they encountered a religious cult which was threatened by a new mysterious group 'X'. Meanwhile, Kurumi decided to carry on with her pregnancy despite being infected with the golem virus.

Season 4 
20 months later, Hibiki found that his daughter Mirai is under the care of the Shinzan Foundation Group. Tension between survivors in the prison continues.

Cast

Ryoma Takeuchi as Hibiki Mamiya (Season 1–4)
Ayami Nakajo as Kurumi Ogasawara (Season 1–3)
Show Kasamatsu as Hiro Todoroki (Season 1–3)
Marie Iitoyo as Kanae Hiiragi (Season 1–4)
Naho Yokomizo as Yuzuki Mihara (Season 1–4)
Kim Jae-hyun as Yoon Min-jun / Mysterious Man (Season 1–3)
Hyunri as Yoon Ji-An (Season 1–3)
Makita Sports as Yohei Komoto (Season 1–2)
Tamae Ando as Shoko Mihara (Season 1–2)
Toshihito Kokubo as Tsubori (Season 1–3)
Kodai Asaka as Rikuto Kuwata (Season 1–2)
Michiko Tanaka as Haru (Season 1–2)
Tina Tamaki as Asaba (Season 4)
Junpei Mizubata as Kaju (Season 4)

References

External links

 
Love You as the World Ends on Netflix

2021 in Japanese television
Japanese drama television series
2021 Japanese television series debuts
Apocalyptic television series
Television series about viral outbreaks
Nippon TV dramas